Gornyak may refer to:

Places 
Gornyak Urban Settlement, a municipal formation which the town of district significance of Gornyak in Loktevsky District of Altai Krai, Russia is incorporated as
Gornyak (inhabited locality), several inhabited localities in Russia

Sports 
FC Gornyak, a soccer team from Aktobe Province, Kazakhstan
FC Gornyak Gramoteino, a soccer team from Kemerovo Oblast, Russia
FC Gornyak Kachkanar, a soccer team from Sverdlovsk Oblast, Russia
FC Gornyak Kushva (1992–1997), a defunct soccer team from Sverdlovsk Oblast, Russia
FC Gornyak Uchaly, a soccer team from the Republic of Bashkortostan, Russia
Gornyak Rudny, an ice hockey team from Kazakhstan

See also 
Gornik (disambiguation)
Hirnyk (disambiguation)